Striaptera is a monotypic moth genus of the family Erebidae erected by George Hampson in 1926. Its only species, Striaptera cinnamomeus, was first described by George Thomas Bethune-Baker in 1908. It is found in New Guinea.

References

Calpinae
Monotypic moth genera